Weissella koreensis is a species of Gram-positive bacteria in the family Leuconostocaceae. The bacteria has irregular cells, is tolerant of acid, and does not develop spores. It was described by Lee et al. in 2002.

References

External links
Type strain of Weissella koreensis at BacDive -  the Bacterial Diversity Metadatabase

Bacteria described in 2002